The Rockwell Mixed Pairs is a national bridge championship held regularly at the Spring American Contract Bridge League (ACBL) North American Bridge Championship (NABC). The Rockwell Trophy, donated by Helen Rockwell in 1946, is presented to the winners. Originally contested at the Fall NABC, the event was moved to the Spring NABC in 1986.

The event is a four-session matchpoint (MP) pairs event with two qualifying and two final sessions; each pair consists of one male and one female player.

Winners
Five pairs have won twice:
 John Crawford and Margaret Wagar, who won in 1948 and successfully defended in 1949; they also finished second in 1947. Crawford also won with Dorothy Hayden in 1959.
 Sidney Silodor and Helen Sobel, who won in 1955 and successfully defended in 1956.  Silodor also won with Edith Rosenbloom in 1941.
 Barry Crane and Kerri Sanborn (then Shuman) won in 1975 and 1982. They finished second in 1971, 1974, and 1977, as Kerri and Stephen Sanborn did in 2008.
 David Berkowitz and Lisa Berkowitz, who won in 1986 and successfully defended in 1987.
 Tom Kniest and Karen Walker won in 2006 and 2009.

See also
 Hilliard Mixed Pairs, predecessor 1931 to 1945

Sources
 1946–2011 winners. 
 2012 winners. 
 2013 winners. 
 2014 winners.

External links

 NABC Winners: Rockwell Mixed Pairs – official database view, all years

North American Bridge Championships
Contract bridge mixed pairs